Al Gamil is a privately held company based in Djibouti City, Djibouti.

Overview
Al Gamil is the largest construction firm in Djibouti. It has its headquarters in the national capital, Djibouti City.

Besides the local construction industry, the Al-Gamil Group (Groupe Al Gamil) also imports and exports various commodities. Among these products for the domestic and international markets are construction materials, foodstuffs and vehicles.

Branches and memberships

The company is a member of the Club Echanges Normandie Afrique. It has additional offices in Dubai and Sharjah in the United Arab Emirates.

See also
Dahabshil Bank International
List of companies based in Djibouti

References

External links
Official website in English

Companies based in Djibouti (city)
Engineering companies of Djibouti